Emma Malabuyo (born November 5, 2002) is an American artistic gymnast. She is a five-time member of the U.S. National Team (2016–19, 2021).  She was an alternate for the 2020 Olympic team.  She is currently competing for the UCLA Bruins gymnastics team.

Early life 
Emma Malabuyo was born to Joel and Ana Malabuyo. Malabuyo began her training at Airborne Gymnastics in Santa Clara, California, but moved to Texas to train under former world champion Kim Zmeskal-Burdette at Texas Dreams in 2013. She qualified as an elite gymnast in 2015.

Gymnastics career

Junior

2016
In March 2016, Malabuyo made her international debut part of the United States' gold-winning junior team at the 2016 L'International Gymnix tournament, where she earned the bronze medal in the all-around competition, as well as two gold medals on balance beam and floor exercise. Later that month at the City of Jesolo Trophy, she won a gold medal on balance beam and earned three silver medals in the all-around, uneven bars, and floor exercise. In June, Malabuyo competed at the 2016 Secret U.S. Classic, where she finished second in the all-around behind fellow Texan Irina Alexeeva of WOGA and third on balance beam. She progressed to the 2016 P&G U.S. National Gymnastics Championships, but pulled out after competing only vault and floor exercise on the first day, and did not medal.

2017
In April 2017, Malabuyo competed at the City of Jesolo Trophy, where she finished third in the all-around behind teammates Gabby Perea and Maile O'Keefe. Later that year Malabuyo won the U.S. Classic ahead of O'keefe. At Nationals, Malabuyo finished second behind defending champion O'Keefe, but finished first on floor exercise, second on uneven bars, and third on vault and was named to the national team. She and O'Keefe were then selected to represent the United States at the 2017 International Junior Gymnastics Competition in Japan. There Malabuyo finished second in the all-around, again behind O'Keefe, and first on floor exercise.

Senior

2018
Malabuyo made her senior debut at the City of Jesolo Trophy, where she competed as an individual alongside club teammate Ragan Smith. She won gold in the all-around, balance beam, and floor exercise.

During the summer, Malabuyo competed only on vault and balance beam at the U.S. Classic due to a nagging back injury, scoring 14.300 and 12.650, respectively, after falling on beam. She finished fourteenth on the event.

She traveled with Smith to Boston in August to compete in the national championships, but pulled out of the event during training to avoid re-aggravating the same injury. As a result, she was not named to the national team after the meet.

2019
In February Malabuyo was named to the team to compete at the 2019 City of Jesolo Trophy alongside Sunisa Lee, Shilese Jones, and Gabby Perea.  As a result, she was added back onto the national team.  In Italy she helped the USA win gold in the team final and individually she won bronze in the all-around behind Lee and Liu Tingting of China, and won silver on balance beam behind reigning World Champion Liu and on floor exercise, behind teammate Lee.  She also placed sixth on uneven bars.

In July, Malabuyo was going to compete at the 2019 U.S. Classic but broke her tibia and was out for the remainder of the season.

In the fall Malabuyo signed her National Letter of Intent with UCLA, joining their team in the 2020–21 school year.

2021 
Malabuyo returned to gymnastics at the 2021 Winter Cup. She competed on three events, including a sixth place finish on beam.  At the National Championships Malabuyo finished fourth in the all-around.  As a result she was named to the national team and selected to compete at the upcoming Olympic Trials.  At the Olympic Trials Malabuyo finished ninth in the all-around and was named as an alternate for the Olympic team.

NCAA

2021–2022 season 
Malabuyo earned her first perfect ten on the balance beam on March 12.

Career perfect 10.0

Selected competitive skills

Competitive history

References

External links 
 

2002 births
American female artistic gymnasts
Junior artistic gymnasts
People from Milpitas, California
People from Flower Mound, Texas
Living people
Gymnasts from Texas
UCLA Bruins women's gymnasts
U.S. women's national team gymnasts
NCAA gymnasts who have scored a perfect 10